Thomas Cambridge Rylan Moore (born 29 March 1992) is an English cricketer, who played for Essex County Cricket Club.

References

External links

Living people
1992 births
Sportspeople from Basildon
Essex cricketers
English cricketers